Police officers in various jurisdictions have power to search members of the public, for example, for weapons, drugs and stolen property. This article concerns searches of members of the public who have not been arrested and who are not held in detention. For search powers in relation to those persons see Search on arrest and Searches in detention. For searches of property, rather than people, see search and seizure.

England and Wales

Police powers in England and Wales, allowing police officers to search members of the public for weapons, drugs, stolen property, terrorism-related evidence or evidence of other crimes are known as stop and search powers.

United States

Searches in the United States are governed by the Fourth Amendment to the U.S. Constitution, which generally requires that the police obtain a warrant before a search is legally permissible. However, certain exceptions to the warrant requirement exist.

After stopping a person based upon the reasonable belief that the person might be engaged in unlawful activity, or following a routine encounter such as a traffic stop, the police in the United States may perform a cursory search of the persons outer clothing for their own safety. Terry v. Ohio. However, unless the object is reasonably identified by feel as a possible weapon or contraband, they may not remove objects from pockets, as that would constitute a search. Minnesota v. Dickerson. When performing a pat-down following a Terry stop that results in the officer identifying a weapon by feel, a police officer is allowed to remove the weapon from the person's clothing.

See also
Proactive policing

References 

Searches and seizures

de:Leibesvisitation